The Sherman County Courthouse is a Queen Anne-style building located in Moro, Oregon listed on the National Register of Historic Places.

It is located at 500 Court Street.  It was designed by prolific architect Charles H. Burggraf and built by A.F. Peterson in 1899.  It was listed on the NRHP in 1998;  the listing included three contributing buildings.

See also
 National Register of Historic Places listings in Sherman County, Oregon

References

External links
 

1899 establishments in Oregon
Buildings and structures in Sherman County, Oregon
County courthouses in Oregon
Courthouses on the National Register of Historic Places in Oregon
Government buildings completed in 1899
National Register of Historic Places in Sherman County, Oregon
Queen Anne architecture in Oregon